The Columbia Pike Line, designated as Routes 16A, 16C & 16E, are daily bus routes operated by the Washington Metropolitan Area Transit Authority between the neighborhoods of  Annandale (16A) or Culmore (16C, 16E) and Pentagon station (16A, 16C) of the Yellow and Blue lines of the Washington Metro, Federal Triangle station (16C Rush Hour Only) of the Blue, Orange and Silver lines, or Franklin Square (16E). This line is part of the Pike Ride service, which runs through Columbia Pike. This line provides service to Annandale or Culmore and the Pentagon Transit Center, Federal Triangle or Franklin Square from the neighborhoods of Fairfax County and Arlington County. Alongside the neighborhoods, it also brings service through the marketplace, business, and offices through Columbia Pike.

Route description and service

The 16A, 16C, and 16E operate from Four Mile Run Division on different schedules. Route 16A operates daily between the neighborhood of Annandale and Pentagon station, through the entire Columbia Pike route. The 16A also runs through other neighborhoods in Columbia Pike, such as Lincolnia, Bailey's Crossroads, Barcroft, Arlington Heights, and Penrose. Route 16A serves limited stops in Arlington County, bringing faster service between Bailey's Crossroads and Pentagon station. Route 16C operates daily between the neighborhood of Culmore and Pentagon station. The 16C joins the route on Columbia Pike through the intersection of Leesburg Pike. Like route 16A, route 16C also serves limited stops in Arlington County, although select rush hour trips of the 16C extend through Washington D.C. up to Federal Triangle station. Route 16E is the only route that does not operate during the daytime. The 16E only operates during late nights daily and early mornings on Saturdays and Sundays. The 16E also starts on Culmore, where the 16C starts. Unlike routes 16A and 16C, route 16E serves all stops in Arlington County, including Pentagon City station. The 16E extends through Washington D.C., by operating up to Franklin Square.

16A stops

16C stops

16E stops

History

The line was part of the Pike Ride route since September 7, 2003. Before then, the Columbia Pike Line was part of the Alexandria, Barcroft and Washington Transit Company, which serves along the Columbia Pike. The line was AB&W’s first route, when it opened in 1921. It was later operated by WMATA in 1973, when it acquired all routes from the AB&W. Since 1973, the Columbia Pike Line consists of all 16 line. Some 16 routes were split into different lines, to run as a sister line which operates on the same road. The 16 line provides premium reliable service in Columbia Pike to connect from neighborhoods, to marketplaces, to landmarks, and to business. The Columbia Pike Line originally operated up to Washington Union Station until June 26, 1983 when all routes were shorten to Pentagon station.

After WMATA's success on the 16 line, Arlington Transit began adding more routes on the Columbia Pike, starting with Route 41. Routes 16B and 16J were the two routes that have a daily service, while routes 16A, 16D, and 16F operated only on weekdays. All routes, except 16F and 16J, runs between Pentagon station and Annandale. Route 16B runs between Pentagon station and the neighborhood of Culmore during weekday peak hours, while it extends to Annandale on the weekends. Route 16E operated during late nights, and is the only route which runs via Pentagon City. Route 16F runs during peak hours only, serving to Pentagon Station in the morning, and the neighborhood of Culmore in the afternoon. The 16F serves limited stops in Arlington County, and local stops in Bailey's Crossroads and Culmore.

In 2008, the 16P joins the Columbia Pike Line, taking over the 16J Sunday service. In 2009, the Sunday 16B reduced Annandale trips, leading to select trips terminating at Culmore, where it ends on weekday rush hours. In 2010, route 16F was renamed as the Columbia Pike–Federal Triangle Line. Other than route 16F, two existing route was formerly part of the Columbia Pike Line, until the line name was changed. Route 16L was part of the line until 1987, when it became the Columbia Pike Express Line. The 16L completely changed the line name to Annandale–Skyline City–Pentagon Line, although it remains connections to route 16A. Route 16G was also part of the Columbia Pike Line, until September, 2003, when the Pike Ride project began. Route 16G was selected to serve to Pentagon City Station, to form the Columbia Pike–Pentagon City Line. Route 16C is the only route in which WMATA used it twice. The old 16C operates on the Columbia Pike Route, until it was discontinued in 2003. After 15 years of absence, WMATA reincarnated the 16C back in the Columbia Pike Line in 2018, with modifications from the old 16C route.

Service changes

The Columbia Pike Line began on multiple service changes throughout the entire service, starting with the name change of the 16L line to the Columbia Pike Express Line. However, some 16 line routes faced some service changes throughout time.

September 2001 changes
Due to the September 11 attacks, the 16 line along with other bus lines that usually serves Pentagon station were rerouted temporarily to Pentagon City station due to security concerns at the Pentagon. Service to Pentagon station would resume on December 16, 2001.

September 2003 changes

Route 16C was discontinued from the Columbia Pike Line service on September 7, 2003. Routes 16B, 16F, and 16J absorbed the remaining portions of the 16C. Route 16F became a limited stop service within Arlington County. Route 16G was transferred to the Columbia Pike–Pentagon City Line to serve Pentagon City Station. Route 16G formed the new line, along with Routes 16H, 16K, and 16W to bring more service from the neighborhoods of Skyline City in Fairfax County, and Barcroft in Arlington County.

2010 Proposed Changes

In 2010 during WMATA's FY2011 budget, WMATA proposed to modify the 16 line with some changes:

The 16 A, B, D, J, P was proposed to reroute off-peak trips, and to serve via Pentagon City station. With these changes, it was planned to rename the off-peak routes as the 16C, and the 16M, while WMATA will continue with the 16P.

The 16F was proposed options to extend its weekday peak service to Downtown in Washington D.C. The proposed 16F extension is expected to replace routes 13A and 13B from the National Airport–Pentagon–Washington Line.

December 2010 changes

Route 16F was transferred to the Columbia Pike–Federal Triangle Line, and extended to Federal Triangle in Washington D.C. After serving time with the Columbia Pike line, 16F times remains unchanged, and continues to serve limited stop in Arlington County, and serves all stops in Washington D.C. This route continues to operate until 2012, when it was renamed to route 16X.

March 2015 changes

Route 16D was discontinued on March 29, 2015, and is replaced by route 16A. Route 16L absorbed the Annandale portion of the 16D, where it ran.

December 2016 changes

On December 18, 2016, route 16E was extended from Pentagon station to Franklin Square in Downtown Washington D.C. due to earlier closures from Metrorail.

June 2018 changes

The Columbia Pike Line began to be rerouted by simplifying various routes into a single route. Routes 16B, 16J, 16P was discontinued on June 24, 2018, and replaced by 16A, 16C, and 16E. Route 16H from the Columbia Pike–Pentagon City Line also took over a portion of routes 16B, 16J, and 16P. Alongside of these changes, daily service was added to the 16A. Route 16C was brought back into the Columbia Pike Line service, after a 15-year hiatus, while other 16 line routes took over the old 16C. Route 16C also replaced the 16X from the Columbia Pike–Federal Triangle Limited Line, which operated up to Federal Triangle in Washington D.C. By bringing more reliable and faster service, the 16A & 16C serves limited stops on Columbia Pike in Arlington County. Routes 16E, 16G & 16H continues to serve to all stops on Columbia Pike in Arlington County.

2020 Proposed Changes
During WMATAs 2021 Fiscal Year budget, it was proposed to eliminate route 16C towards Downtown DC to reduce redundancy with the Blue and Yellow Lines and to fully eliminate route 16E which will be replaced by restored late night Metrorail service.

September 2020 proposed changes 
On September 10, 2020 as part of its FY2022 proposed budget, WMATA proposed to truncate route 16C service from Downtown DC to Pentagon station, in order to reduce costs and low federal funds. It was also proposed to reduce weekend service on all routes of this line. Weeknight 16E service is unaffected, however, all 16E trips after midnight is proposed to be eliminated. Route 16C has not operated to Downtown DC since March 13, 2020 due to Metro's response to the COVID-19 pandemic.

References 

16A